Passalus caelatus is a beetle of the Family Passalidae.

References 

Passalidae